Rod Machado (born 1953) is a pilot and author of aviation flight training materials. He is ATPL rated, and a member of the Aviation Speakers Bureau.

Biography 
Rod Machado was born in the San Francisco Bay Area in 1953. He began flying at 16 after selling his motorcycle, and did his first solo flight at 17. He subsequently became a flight instructor, and earned all the ratings up to ATP, including private pilot certificate, instrument rating, and Commercial Pilot Certificate, as well as several type ratings. Machado currently flies a Cessna 150.

Machado is also an eager runner as well as holding black belts in both the disciplines of Tae Kwon Do and Hapkido as also having trained over a decade in the Brazilian-based Gracie Jujitsu. Due in part to his martial arts interest and speaking experience, he was featured as an analyst at the first Ultimate Fighting Championship, held in Denver, Colorado in 1993.

Bibliography 
Machado's books include:
 Rod Machado's Private Pilot Handbook (2nd edition released 2008) (also available on audiobook and MP3)
 Rod Machado's Instrument Pilot's Survival Manual (2003)

In computer software
Rod Machado is the flight-instructor voice that narrates user-interactive lesson modules in Microsoft Flight Simulator 2000, Microsoft Flight Simulator 2002, Microsoft Flight Simulator 2004: A Century of Flight and Microsoft Flight Simulator X.

References

Further reading
 “Plane Talk” From Machado | PlaneAndPilotMag.com
 AOPA Online: Machado encourages prospective students
 AOPA Online: Aviation: The power to transform lives
 The Press-Courier - Google News Archive Search
 Rod Machado Rolls Out Instrument Pilot's Survival Manual Third Edition | Aero-News Network
 Rod Machado | AVweb

External links 
 

Flight training
1953 births
Living people
American aviation writers
Commercial aviators
Aviators from California
American flight instructors